Tropidosaura essexi, also known commonly as Essex's mountain lizard, is a species of lizard in the family Lacertidae. The species is native to southern Africa.

Etymology
The specific name, essexi, is in honor of South African herpetologist Robert Essex.

Geographic range
T. essexi is found in Lesotho and South Africa.

Habitat

Description
T. essexi is small for its genus. Adults have a snout-to-vent length (SVL) of only .

Behavior
T. essexi is diurnal and terrestrial.

Reproduction
T. essexi is viviparous, and is the only African lacertid known to be viviparous.

References

Further reading
FitzSimons VF (1943). The Lizards of South Africa. Transvaal Museum Memoir No. 1. Pretoria: Transvaal Museum. xvi + 528 pp. (Tropidosaura essexi, p. 309).
Hewitt J (1927). "Further descriptions of reptiles and batrachians from South Africa". Records of the Albany Museum, Grahamstown 3 (5): 371–415. (Tropidosaura essexi, new species, p. 378).
Nicolau GK, Jackson EA, Jordaan A, Alexander GJ (2022). "Tropidosaura essexi Hewitt, 1927 (Reptilia: Lacertidae) is live bearing: the only viviparous African lacertid". African Journal of Herpetology 71 (2): 194–200.

Tropidosaura
Reptiles described in 1927
Taxa named by John Hewitt (herpetologist)